Darya Lal Mandir or(also known as Darya Lal Sankat Mochan Mandir)is a Hindu temple in Karachi, Pakistan. It is located near Custom House, Saddar Town in the Sindh Province of Pakistan. It is a 300 year old temple.  The temple is dedicated to Darya Lal (Jhulelal),who is considered as incarnation of Varuna Deva

History
The temple was constructed 300 years ago. The temple has a square shaped prayer area ( 40ft by 40ft). The temple was attacked in 1965 and in 1992 in retaliation of the Babri Masjid Incident.The temple became office of the transporting company.  The temple was in a dilapidated condition and regular worshippers stopped coming.

Architecture

It was built using limestone and the Jung Shahi stone. The  temple has 40 feet wide, 40 feet long and 40 feet high dimensions. The are 40 blue snakes painted at the top of the temple.

Renovation
In 2015, the temple was renovated as a part of Eduljee Dinshaw Road project. The façade of the temple was brought from India and during the renovation the dimensions of the temple  were kept intact. The temple was then inaugurated by Sindh Governor Dr Ishratul Ibad on Dec 13, 2015.

Religious Significance
The temple is dedicated to Darya Lal (Jhulelal) who is an incarnation of Varuna Deva. The temple also hosts Lord Hanuman and Lord Ganesh. According to Gowswami Vijay Maharaj (caretaker of the temple), the temple hosts Lord Hanuman because  when Hanuman flied to Lanka to save Sita from the clutches of Ravana over the sea, he was flying so fast that the Varuna Deva mounted his makara and asked "who he was.” After that every devotee who come to worship Varuna Devta also pay their respects to Hanuman.

See also
Kalka Cave Temple
 Ramapir Temple Tando Allahyar
 Umarkot Shiv Mandir
 Hinglaj Mata mandir
 Ratneshwar Mahadev Temple, Karachi
 Sant Nenuram Ashram

References

Hindu temples in Pakistan
Krishna temples
Hindu temples in Sindh
Hindu temples in Karachi
Buildings and structures in Karachi
Heritage sites in Karachi